Sling may refer to:

Places
Sling, Anglesey, Wales
Sling, Gloucestershire, England, a small village in the Forest of Dean

People with the name
 Otto Šling (1912–1952), repressed Czech communist functionary

Arts, entertainment, and media
 Sling (Transformers), a fictional character
 Sling TV, a U.S. IPTV service operated by Dish Network
 Sling (album), 2021 studio album by Clairo

Clothing
 Baby sling, a piece of fabric tied to carry a child or infant
 Sling swimsuit, a type of swimsuit, sometimes a bikini variant
 Slingback, a type of woman's shoe

Devices and weapons 
 Sling (cannon), an early modern gunpowder weapon
 Sling (climbing equipment), a loop of webbing that can be wrapped around rock or tied to other equipment
 Sling (firearms), a type of strap or harness that allows convenient carrying of a long gun and/or bracing of the weapon for better stability during aiming
 Sling (furniture), a suspended, free-swinging chair, bed, or hammock
 Sex swing, also known as a "sling"
 Sling (rigging), a component used in a rigging system for lifting, frequently made of wire rope or synthetic fiber
 Sling (weapon), a device used to hurl projectiles
 Slingshot (esp in the United States), a small hand-powered projectile weapon
 Hawaiian sling, a device used in spearfishing

Drinks
 Sling (drink), a mixed drink, originally American, composed of spirit and water, sweetened and flavoured
 Singapore Sling, a cocktail that was invented by Ngiam Tong Boon for the Raffles Hotel in Singapore

Healthcare
 Sling (implant), in surgery
 Sling (medicine), a device to limit movement of the shoulder or elbow while it heals

Computer Technology
 Apache Sling, a Java web framework
 Sling Media, a technology company that provides placeshifting and Smart TV technology

See also 
 Slinger (disambiguation)
 Slingshot (disambiguation)